Margaretta High School is a public high school in Castalia, Ohio.  It is the only high school in the Margaretta Local Schools district.  They are members of the Sandusky Bay Conference.

Sandusky Bay Conference championships (1963-present)

Football: 1983*, 1985, 1986, 1991*, 1995*, 1996, 1997, 2001 
Volleyball: 1987, 1997, 1998, 2010*
Girls Cross Country: 1983, 1984, 1993, 1994
Boys Basketball: 1963–64, 2003–04
Girls Basketball: 1985-86*, 1986–87, 1987–88, 1988-89*, 1990–91, 1991-92*, 1992–93, 1993–94, 1994–95, 1998–99, 2000-01*, 2001-02*, 2004–05, 2005–06, 2008–09
Baseball: 1970, 1974*, 1975, 1978, 1985, 1986*, 1989, 1990*, 1993
Softball: 1983*, 1984, 1985, 1987, 1988, 1989, 1990, 1992*, 1993
Boys Track & Field: 1972
Girls Track & Field: 1994, 1995, 1997

(years marked with an asterisk (*) denote a shared title)
source

Ohio High School Athletic Association State Championships
 Boys Basketball – 1932

Notes and references

External links
 District Website

High schools in Erie County, Ohio
Public high schools in Ohio